The IWF Junior World Championships is organised by the International Weightlifting Federation (IWF). The first competition was held in 1975.

Editions

References

External links
Full Results 1975 to 2020
Men's
Women's
Weightlifting Database
1975 Results
1997 to 2007 Results

 
Weightlifting competitions
World youth sports competitions